Compressed hydrogen (CH2, CGH2 or CGH2) is the gaseous state of the element hydrogen kept under pressure. Compressed hydrogen in hydrogen tanks at 350 bar (5,000 psi) and 700 bar (10,000 psi) is used for mobile hydrogen storage in hydrogen vehicles. It is used as a fuel gas.

Infrastructure
Compressed hydrogen is used in hydrogen pipeline transport and in compressed hydrogen tube trailer transport.

See also
Cryo-adsorption
Gas compressor
Gasoline gallon equivalent
Hydrogen compressor
Hydrogen safety
Liquid hydrogen
Liquefaction of gases
Metallic hydrogen
Slush hydrogen
Standard cubic foot
Timeline of hydrogen technologies

References

External links
 COMPRESSED HYDROGEN INFRASTRUCTURE PROGRAM ("CH2IP")

Hydrogen physics
Hydrogen technologies
Hydrogen storage
Fuel gas
Gases
Industrial gases